The Ethiopian dwarf mongoose (Helogale hirtula), also known as the desert dwarf mongoose or Somali dwarf mongoose, is a mongoose native to East Africa, particularly Ethiopia, Kenya, and Somalia.

The Ethiopian dwarf mongoose will send out warning calls to its family if a predator is detected. They have also been known to produce general alarm calls when danger is not present. These calls have different pitches which indicate different levels of urgency for the family. A study of dwarf mongoose suggested that they could convey the predator's species, distance and elevation to the family all through alarm calls.

Subspecies
Helogale hirtula hirtula
Helogale hirtula ahlselli
Helogale hirtula annulata
Helogale hirtula lutescens
Helogale hirtula powelli

References

Ethiopian dwarf mongoose
Mammals of Ethiopia
Fauna of the Horn of Africa
Ethiopian dwarf mongoose
Ethiopian dwarf mongoose